Spinal fusion, also called spondylodesis or spondylosyndesis, is a neurosurgical or orthopedic surgical technique that joins two or more vertebrae.  This procedure can be performed at any level in the spine (cervical, thoracic, lumbar, or sacral) and prevents any movement between the fused vertebrae.  There are many types of spinal fusion and each technique involves using bone grafting—either from the patient (autograft), donor (allograft), or artificial bone substitutes—to help the bones heal together.  Additional hardware (screws, plates, or cages) is often used to hold the bones in place while the graft fuses the two vertebrae together. The placement of hardware can be guided by fluoroscopy, navigation systems, or robotics.

Spinal fusion is most commonly performed to relieve the pain and pressure from mechanical pain of the vertebrae or on the spinal cord that results when a disc (cartilage between two vertebrae) wears out (degenerative disc disease).  It is also used as a backup procedure for total disc replacement surgery (intervertebral disc arthroplasty), in case patient anatomy prevents replacement of the disc. Other common pathological conditions that are treated by spinal fusion include spinal stenosis, spondylolisthesis, spondylosis, spinal fractures, scoliosis, and kyphosis.

Like any surgery, complications may include infection, blood loss, and nerve damage.  Fusion also changes the normal motion of the spine and results in more stress on the vertebrae above and below the fused segments.  As a result, long-term complications include degeneration at these adjacent spine segments.

Medical uses

Spinal fusion can be used to treat a variety of conditions affecting any level of the spine—lumbar, cervical and thoracic.  In general, spinal fusion is performed to decompress and stabilize the spine. The greatest benefit appears to be in spondylolisthesis, while evidence is less good for spinal stenosis.

The most common cause of pressure on the spinal cord/nerves is degenerative disc disease. Other common causes include disc herniation, spinal stenosis, trauma, and spinal tumors. Spinal stenosis results from bony growths (osteophytes) or thickened ligaments that cause narrowing of the spinal canal over time.  This causes leg pain with increased activity, a condition called neurogenic claudication. Pressure on the nerves as they exit the spinal cord (radiculopathy) causes pain in the area where the nerves originated (leg for lumbar pathology, arm for cervical pathology).  In severe cases, this pressure can cause neurologic deficits, like numbness, tingling, bowel/bladder dysfunction, and paralysis.

Lumbar and cervical spinal fusions are more commonly performed than thoracic fusions.  Degeneration happens more frequently at these levels due to increased motion and stress.  The thoracic spine is more immobile, so most fusions are performed due to trauma or deformities like scoliosis, kyphosis, and lordosis.

Conditions where spinal fusion may be considered include the following:
 Degenerative disc disease
 Spinal disc herniation
 Discogenic pain
 Spinal tumor
 Vertebral fracture
 Scoliosis
 Kyphosis (e. g., Scheuermann's disease)
 Lordosis
 Spondylolisthesis
 Spondylosis
 Posterior rami syndrome
 Other degenerative spinal conditions
 Any condition that causes instability of the spine

Contraindications
Bone morphogenetic protein (rhBMP) should not be routinely used in any type of anterior cervical spine fusion, such as with anterior cervical discectomy and fusion. There are reports of this therapy causing soft tissue swelling, which in turn can cause life-threatening complications due to difficulty swallowing and pressure on the respiratory tract.

Epidemiology
According to a report by the Agency for Healthcare Research and Quality (AHRQ), approximately 488,000 spinal fusions were performed during U.S. hospital stays in 2011 (a rate of 15.7 stays per 10,000 population), which accounted for 3.1% of all operating room procedures.  This was a 70 percent growth in procedures from 2001.  Lumbar fusions are the most common type of fusion performed ~ 210,000 per year.  24,000 thoracic fusions and 157,000 cervical fusions are performed each year.

A 2008 analysis of spinal fusions in the United States reported the following characteristics:
 Average age for someone undergoing a spinal fusion was 54.2 years – 53.3 years for primary cervical fusions, 42.7 years for primary thoracic fusions, and 56.3 years for primary lumbar fusions 
 45.5% of all spinal fusions were on men 
 83.8% were white, 7.5% black, 5.1% Hispanic, 1.6% Asian or Pacific Islander, 0.4% Native American 
 Average length of hospital stay was 3.7 days – 2.7 days for primary cervical fusion, 8.5 days for primary thoracic fusion, and 3.9 days for primary lumbar fusion 
 In-hospital mortality was 0.25%

Effectiveness 
Although spinal fusion surgery is widely performed, there is limited evidence for its effectiveness for several common medical conditions. For example, in a randomized controlled trial of people with spinal stenosis, after 2 and 5 years there was no significant clinical benefits  of lumbar fusion in combination with decompression surgery, in comparison to decompression surgery alone.  This Swedish study, including 247 patients enrolled from 2006 to 2012, further found increased medical costs for those who received the fusion surgery, as a result of increased surgery time, hospital stay duration, and cost of the implant.

Additionally, a 2009 systematic review on surgery for lower back pain found that for nonradicular low back pain with degenerative disk disease, there was no benefit in health outcomes (improvement in pain or function) of performing fusion surgery in comparison to intensive rehabilitation including cognitive-behavioral treatment. Similarly, researchers in Washington State viewed lumbar fusion surgery to have questionable medical benefit, increased costs and increased risks, in comparison to intensive pain programs for chronic low back pain with degenerative disk disease.

Technique 
There are many types of spinal fusion techniques.  Each technique varies depending on the level of the spine and the location of the compressed spinal cord/nerves.  After the spine is decompressed, bone graft or artificial bone substitute is packed between the vertebrae to help them heal together.  In general, fusions are done either on the anterior (stomach), posterior (back), or both sides of the spine.  Today, most fusions are supplemented with hardware (screws, plates, rods) because they have been shown to have higher union rates than non-instrumented fusions.  Minimally invasive techniques are also becoming more popular.  These techniques use advanced image guidance systems to insert rods/screws into the spine through smaller incisions, allowing for less muscle damage, blood loss, infections, pain, and length of stay in the hospital.  The following list gives examples of common types of fusion techniques performed at each level of the spine:

Cervical spine 
 Anterior cervical discectomy and fusion (ACDF)
 Anterior cervical corpectomy and fusion
 Posterior cervical decompression and fusion

Thoracic spine 
 Anterior decompression and fusion
 Posterior instrumentation and fusion  – many different types of hardware can be used to help fuse the thoracic spine including sublaminar wiring, pedicle and transverse process hooks, pedicle screw-rod systems, vertebral body plate systems.

Lumbar spine 
 Posterolateral fusion is a bone graft between the transverse processes in the back of the spine.  These vertebrae are then fixed in place with screws or wire through the pedicles of each vertebra, attaching to a metal rod on each side of the vertebrae.
 Interbody Fusion is a graft where the entire intervertebral disc between vertebrae is removed and a bone graft is placed in the space between the vertebra.  A plastic or titanium device may be placed between the vertebra to maintain spine alignment and disc height.  The types of interbody fusion are:
 Anterior lumbar interbody fusion (ALIF) –  the disc is accessed from an anterior abdominal incision
 Posterior lumbar interbody fusion (PLIF) – the disc is accessed from a posterior incision
 Transforaminal lumbar interbody fusion (TLIF) – the disc is accessed from a posterior incision on one side of the spine
 Transpsoas interbody fusion (DLIF or XLIF) – the disc is accessed from an incision through the psoas muscle on one side of the spine
 Oblique lateral lumbar interbody fusion (OLLIF) – the disc is accessed from an incision through the psoas muscle obliquely

Risks 
Spinal fusion is a high risk surgery and complications can be serious, including death.  In general, there is a higher risk of complications in older people with elevated body mass index (BMI), other medical problems, poor nutrition and nerve symptoms (numbness, weakness, bowel/bladder issues) before surgery.  Complications also depend on the type/extent of spinal fusion surgery performed.  There are three main time periods where complications typically occur:

During surgery 
 Patient positioning on operating table
 Blood loss
 Damage to nerves and surrounding structures during procedure
 Insertion of spinal hardware
 Harvesting of bone graft (if autograft is used)

Within a few days 
 Moderate to severe postoperative pain
 Wound infections - risk factors include old age, obesity, diabetes, smoking, prior surgery
 Deep vein thrombosis (DVT)
 Pulmonary embolism (PE)
 Urinary retention
 Malnutrition
 Neurologic deficit

Weeks to years following surgery 
 Infection – sources of bacterial bioburden that infiltrate the wound site are several, but the latest research highlights repeated reprocessing of implants before surgery and exposure of implants (such as pedicle screws) to bacterial contaminants in the "sterile-field" during surgery as major risk factors.
 Deformity – loss of height, alignment, and failure of fusion
 Pseudarthrosis – nonunion between fused bone segments.  Risk factors include tobacco use, nonsteroidal anti-inflammatory drug use, osteoporosis, revision procedures, decreased immune system.
 Adjacent segment disease – degeneration of vertebrae above/below the fused segments due altered biomechanical stresses or patient propensity to develop progressive degenerative change.
 Epidural fibrosis – scarring of the tissue that surrounds the spinal cord
 Arachnoiditis – inflammation of the thin membrane surrounding the spinal cord, usually caused by infection or contrast dye.

Recovery 
Recovery following spinal fusion is extremely variable, depending on individual surgeon's preference and the type of procedure performed.  The average length of hospital stay for spinal fusions is 3.7 days.  Some patients can go home the same day if they undergo a simple cervical spinal fusion at an outpatient surgery center.  Minimally invasive surgeries are also significantly reducing the amount of time spent in the hospital.  Recovery typically involves both restriction of certain activities and rehabilitation training. Restrictions following surgery largely depend on surgeon preference.  A typical timeline for common restrictions after a lumbar fusion surgery are listed below:
 Walking – most people are out of bed and walking the day after surgery
 Sitting – can begin at 1–6 weeks following surgery
 Lifting – it is generally recommended to avoid lifting until 12 weeks
 Driving – usually can begin at 3–6 weeks
 Return to sedentary work – usually between 3–6 weeks
 Return to manual work – between 7–12 weeks
Rehabilitation after spinal fusion is not mandatory.  There is some evidence that it improves functional status and low back pain so some surgeons may recommend it.

Usage
According to a report by the Agency for Healthcare Research and Quality (AHRQ), approximately 488,000 spinal fusions were performed during U.S. hospital stays in 2011 (a rate of 15.7 stays per 10,000 population), which accounted for 3.1% of all operating room procedures.

Public health hazard 
In 2019, WTOL released an investigation titled "Surgical implants raising contamination concerns", uncovering dossier of scientific evidences that current methods of processing and handling spinal implants are extremely unhygienic and lacks quality control. This lack of quality control is exposing patients to high risk of infection, which themselves are under-reported given the long time frame (0–7 years) and hence lack of follow up data on the patients undergoing spine surgery. A petition has been filed by the lead investigator of this discovery, Aakash Agarwal, to rectify this global public health hazard of implanting contaminated spinal devices in patients.

References

Further reading 
 Cervical Spinal Fusion. WebMD.
 A Patient's Guide to Anterior Cervical Fusion. University of Maryland Medical Center.
 Boatright, K. C. and S. D. Boden. Chapter 12: Biology of Spine Fusion. In: Lieberman, J., et al., Eds. Bone Regeneration and Repair. Totowa, New Jersey: Humana Press. 2005. pp. 225–239.  .
 Holmes, C. F., et al. Chapter 9: Cervical Spine Injuries. In: Schenck, R. F., AAOS. Athletic Training in Sports Medicine. Jones & Bartlett Publishers. 2005. pp. 197–218. 
 Camillo, F. X. Chapter 36: Arthrodesis of the Spine. In: Canale, S. T. and J. H. Beaty. Campbell's Operative Orthopaedics 2. (11th Ed.). Philadelphia: Mosby. 2007. pp. 1851–1874. .
 Williams, K. D. and A. L. Park. Chapter 39: Lower Back Pain and Disorders of Intervertebral Discs. In: Canale, S. T. and J. H. Beaty. Campbell's Operative Orthopaedics 2. (11th Ed.). Philadelphia: Mosby. 2007. pp. 2159–2224. .
 Weyreuther, M., et al., Eds. Chapter 7: The Postoperative Spine. MRI Atlas: Orthopedics and Neurosurgery – The Spine. trans. B. Herwig. Berlin: Springer-Verlag. 2006. pp. 273–288. .
 
 Resnick, D. K., et al. Surgical Management of Low Back Pain (2nd Ed.). Rolling Meadows, Illinois: American Association of Neurosurgeons. 2008. .
 Oblique Lateral Lumbar Interbody Fusion (OLLIF): Technical Notes and Early Results of a Single Surgeon Comparative Study. NIH.

External links
 Wheeless, C. R., et al., Eds. Fusion of the Spine. Wheeless' Textbook of Orthopaedics. Division of Orthopedic Surgery. Duke University Medical Center.
 Spinal Fusion. American Academy of Orthopaedic Surgeons. June 2010. Accessed 1 June 2013.
 Spinasanta, S. What is Spinal Instrumentation and Spinal Fusion? SpineUniverse. September 2012. Accessed 1 June 2013.
 Spinal fusion. Encyclopedia of Surgery. Accessed 1 June 2013.

Neurosurgical procedures
Orthopedic surgical procedures